Richard Carlton Deth, Ph.D., is a neuropharmacologist, a former professor of pharmacology at Northeastern University in Boston, Massachusetts, and is on the scientific advisory board of the National Autism Association. Deth has published scientific studies on the role of D4 dopamine receptors in psychiatric disorders, as well as the book, Molecular Origins of Human Attention: The Dopamine-Folate Connection. He has also become a prominent voice in the controversies in autism and thiomersal and vaccines, due to his hypothesis that certain children are more at risk than others because they lack the normal ability to excrete neurotoxic metals.

Education
Deth attended State University of New York at Buffalo, where he graduated in 1970 with a bachelor's degree in pharmacy. In 1975, Deth obtained his PhD from the University of Miami with a thesis entitled "The relative contribution of Ca++ influx and intracellular Ca++ release in the drug induced contraction of the rabbit aorta."

Research focus
The primary realm of research conducted by Deth involves the role of D4 dopamine receptors in schizophrenia and attention. He has focused on understanding the molecular basis of transmembrane signaling by G protein-coupled receptors, the study of their structure using three-dimensional molecular graphics, and modeling how the binding of various drugs causes a shift in their molecular form.

Deth has characterized the conformation-dependent participation of D4 dopamine receptors in the process of phospholipid methylation, and found that different states of methylation yield varying degrees of spontaneous activity of G protein coupling. He has theorized that these processes are involved in the neural mechanisms of attention. Deth has found that insulin-like growth factor-1 (IGF-1) and dopamine both stimulated folate-dependent methylation pathways in neuronal cells, while compounds like ethanol, the vaccine preservative thimerosal, and metals (like mercury, which is contained in thimerosal, and lead) inhibited these same biochemical pathways at low concentrations resembling those found following vaccination or other sources of exposure. An enzyme mediating methylation, methionine synthase, uses an active form of vitamin B12 to complete its chemical function. Thimerosal interferes with the conversion of dietary forms of B12 into the active form and so impedes DNA methylation and disrupts mercury detoxification and some normal gene actions.

Based on this research, Deth has theorized that thimerosal in vaccines could give rise to autism in a subset of children who are genetically vulnerable; he has also contended that the body's response to thimerosal is a hormetic one, in which low-level exposure to the substance causes a beneficial effect. He played an active role in the initial confusion about the suggested relationship thiomersal and vaccines, testifying twice to Congress about his views. Deth's hypothesis is, however, contradicted by much of the current literature about the causes of autism, which indicates that the levels of thimerosal found in vaccines and other sources cannot be directly implicated as a cause. This aspect of his research attracted such controversy that a dean at Northeastern University once wrote a letter to Deth telling him to stop.

See also
List of vaccine-related topics

References

External links

1945 births
American neuroscientists
American pharmacologists
Autism researchers
Living people
Northeastern University faculty
People from Boston
Thiomersal and vaccines
University at Buffalo alumni
University of Miami alumni